Silla University is a private university located in the second largest city of Busan, South Korea. To encourage international careers, collaborations and exchanges, Silla University maintains strong international links with 175 universities in 28 countries.

Notable people
Kim Chae-yeon, actress

References

External links 
Official site
office of international affairs | study in korea

Private universities and colleges in South Korea
Universities and colleges in Busan